Vanhoutte or van Houtte is a surname of French and Belgium origin.

Vanhoutte 
 Alexandre Vanhoutte, French bobsledder
 Charles Vanhoutte, Belgium football player
 Emily Vanhoutte, Belgium Miss Earth 2014
 Fenna Vanhoutte, Belgium cyclist
 Marie Léonie Vanhoutte, French World War I spy
 Stien Vanhoutte, Belgium speed skater

Van Houtte 

 Albert-Louis Van Houtte, French-born Canadian businessman and coffee specialist
 Jean Van Houtte, Belgium politician
 Louis van Houtte, Belgium horticulturalist

Other uses 
 Van Houtte, coffee company
Ulmus 'Louis van Houtte', an elm tree species

Surnames
Surnames of French origin
Surnames of Belgian origin